Claës-Axel Wersäll (26 June 1888 – 12 February 1951) was a Swedish gymnast. He was part of the Swedish team that won the gold medal in the Swedish system event at the 1912 Summer Olympics.

Wersäll was born to the Swedish Finance Minister Claës Wersäll and Charlotta Wersäll, in a family of 10 siblings. Two of his eight brothers, Gustaf and Ture also competed at Summer Olympics.

References

1888 births
1951 deaths
Swedish male artistic gymnasts
Gymnasts at the 1912 Summer Olympics
Olympic gymnasts of Sweden
Olympic gold medalists for Sweden
Olympic medalists in gymnastics
Medalists at the 1912 Summer Olympics